Mademoiselle from Paris (French: Mademoiselle de Paris) is a 1955 French comedy film directed by Walter Kapps and starring Jean-Pierre Aumont, Gisèle Pascal and Nadine Basile. The film was one of several films set in the work of high fashion made during the decade, popularising the New Look of Christian Dior. It was shot using Eastmancolor. The film's sets were designed by the art director Rino Mondellini.

Synpsis
Micheline works hard to keep the struggling fashion house of her employer, Maurice, afloat. When it goes out of business she accepts an offer to tour the country as an accompanist to the singer Jacqueline François. In Nice she encounters both her sister and Maurice who is now planning to start a new fashion house.

Cast
 Jean-Pierre Aumont as Maurice Darnal
 Gisèle Pascal as Micheline Bertier
 Nadine Basile as 	Léa Berthier
 Jean Lara as Pierre Rollin
 Raphaël Patorni as 	Max, le fournisseur
 René Blancard as Le père de Micheline
 Jacqueline François as Herself
 Capucine as Herself
 Claudy Chapeland as 	Claude Berthier
 Jacqueline Huet as 	Une collaboratrice
 Raymond Loyer as Max
 Jean Marchat as Hubert
 Henri Arius as L'acteur
 Robert Seller as Le notaire
 Georges Sellier as 	L'avoué

References

Bibliography
 Shingler, Martin. Star Studies: A Critical Guide. Bloomsbury Publishing, 2012.

External links 
 

1955 films
French comedy films
1950s French-language films
1955 comedy films
Films directed by Walter Kapps
Films set in Paris
Films set in Nice
1950s French films